The Haima 2 is a subcompact hatchback produced by Haima.

Overview
The styling of the Haima 2 heavily resembles the second-generation Mazda2, and could be easily mistaken for a Mazda product styling wise.  A 1.3 or 1.5 liter engine was available paired to a 5-speed manual or a 6-speed Getrag automatic transmission. Prices starts from 53,900 yuan to 68,900 yuan.

2013 facelift
A facelift in 2013 mainly changed the styling of the front and rear bumpers.

References

External links 

Haima vehicles
Cars introduced in 2009
Ford B3 platform
Front-wheel-drive vehicles
Hatchbacks
Subcompact cars
Cars of China